This is a list of Appalachian State Mountaineers football players in the NFL Draft.

Key

Selections

References 

Appalachian State

Appalachian State Mountaineers NFL Draft